The Samsung SGH-T100 is a dual-band GSM mobile phone manufactured by Samsung in 2002. It was the first mobile phone to use a thin-film transistor active matrix LCD display; prior to the release of the SGH-T100 all phones had used passive matrix display technology. By 2003, it sold over 10million units worldwide.

References 

T100
Mobile phones introduced in 2001